Deborah Platt Majoras is the former chair of the Federal Trade Commission, appointed May 11, 2004, by President George W. Bush and sworn in on August 16, 2004.  President Bush had announced his intention to appoint her to the position on July 30, 2004. Majoras is a member of the Republican Party.

Majoras filled the FTC vacancy created by Timothy Muris, who announced May 11, 2004 that he would step down to become a law professor at George Mason University.  Majoras was replaced by William Kovacic in March 2008. In early 2008, she announced that she was leaving the FTC to become senior vice president and general counsel for Procter & Gamble, the largest consumer products company in the United States.

Early life and education

Majoras was born in Titusville, Pennsylvania. Majoras received a J.D. from the University of Virginia in 1989, where she was awarded the Order of the Coif and served as an editor of UVA's Law Review. She graduated summa cum laude from Westminster College in 1985.

Career

She joined the Justice Department in 2001, as Deputy Assistant Attorney General at the Department of Justice's Antitrust Division. In her tenure, she oversaw matters involving numerous industries including software, financial networks, defense, health care, media and entertainment, banking and industrial equipment. Previously, she was a partner in the antitrust division at Jones Day.

Majoras was appointed as chair of the U.S. Federal Trade Commission by President George W. Bush in 2004. Majoras' tenure as FTC Chairperson was marked by the commission's strong efforts to protect and enhance consumer welfare. She focused on ensuring data security and protecting consumers from emerging frauds, such as identity theft, spyware and deceptive spam. In May 2006, she was appointed by President George W. Bush to be co-chair of the Identity Theft Task Force. Majoras focused on increasing the efficiency and transparency of the merger review process, implementing sound antitrust policy regarding intellectual property, increasing efforts to prevent anticompetitive government policies and strengthening cooperation with consumer and competition agencies around the world.

She left the FTC in 2008 to join Procter & Gamble as senior vice president and general counsel. Since 2010 she has been chief legal officer and secretary of P&G.

Majoras is a member of the American Bar Association's Section of Antitrust Law. She also served as a non-governmental advisor to the International Competition Network (ICN) and was named by President Bush to serve on the Antitrust Modernization Commission. She is a frequent speaker on competition and consumer protection policy issues to national and international audiences.

See also 
 List of former FTC commissioners

References

External links

Federal Trade Commission personnel
Living people
Year of birth missing (living people)
George W. Bush administration personnel